Birun Bashm Rural District is a rural district (dehestan) in Kelardasht District, Chalus County, Mazandaran Province, Iran. At the 2006 census, its population was 5,852, in 1,602 families. The rural district has 35 villages.

See also 
 Kelarestaq

References 

Rural Districts of Mazandaran Province
Chalus County